Carol Hittson Kent (born May 29, 1953) is a Democratic former member of the Texas House of Representatives, representing House District 102 in the Eighty-first Texas Legislature after her election in 2008. District 102 encompassed the Western part of Garland and a portion of North Dallas. In the 2008 general election, she narrowly unseated 20-year incumbent Republican Tony Goolsby. After one term, she lost her 2010 reelection bid to the Republican African-American Stefani Carter of Dallas.

Early life
Kent grew up in Garland, Texas, where she graduated from South Garland High School. She received both Bachelor of Arts and Master of Arts degrees from Baylor University in Waco, Texas. She resides in the Lake Highlands area.

References

External links
Official Campaign Website (now defunct)

Democratic Party members of the Texas House of Representatives
Women state legislators in Texas
Living people
1953 births
People from Garland, Texas
21st-century American politicians
21st-century American women politicians